Heterogeneous nuclear ribonucleoprotein D-like, also known as HNRPDL, is a protein which in humans is encoded by the HNRPDL gene.

Function 

This gene belongs to the subfamily of ubiquitously expressed heterogeneous nuclear ribonucleoproteins (hnRNPs). The hnRNPs are RNA binding proteins and they complex with heterogeneous nuclear RNA (hnRNA). These proteins are associated with pre-mRNAs in the nucleus and appear to influence pre-mRNA processing and other aspects of mRNA metabolism and transport. While all of the hnRNPs are present in the nucleus, some seem to shuttle between the nucleus and the cytoplasm. The hnRNP proteins have distinct nucleic acid binding properties. The protein encoded by this gene has two RRM domains that bind to RNAs. Two alternatively spliced transcript variants have been described for this gene. One of the variants is probably not translated because the transcript is a candidate for nonsense-mediated mRNA decay. The protein encoded by this gene is similar to its family member HNRPD.

Clinical Significance  

Heterozygous nonsense mutations in HNRNPDL has been identified as the cause of the autosomal disorder, Limb-girdle muscular dystrophy.

References

Further reading